SS Nottingham was a passenger and freight vessel built for the Manchester, Sheffield and Lincolnshire Railway in 1891.

History

The ship was built by Swan Hunter in Wallsend and launched on 13 March 1891.

In 1897 she was acquired by the Great Central Railway.  On 11 December 1912 she went ashore in thick fog on Scrooby Sands. Despite the efforts of the tug, United Service, she could not be got off, so the 12 passengers were taken by United Service to Yarmouth, and landed them in the afternoon. She was refloated later that day. A year later, on 26 December 1913, she was grounded again, this time on a mud bank near the Royal Dock in Grimsby.

In 1915 she was requisitioned by the Admiralty as a naval supply vessel and became HMS Notts. After the war she was refurbished and returned to the Great Central Railway as SS Nottingham. In 1923 she was acquired by the London and North Eastern Railway who kept her in service until she was scrapped in 1935.

References

1891 ships
Steamships of the United Kingdom
Ships built on the River Tyne
Ships of the Manchester, Sheffield and Lincolnshire Railway
Ships of the Great Central Railway
Ships of the London and North Eastern Railway